The Momin Ansari or saudagar are a Muslim community found mainly in India, Pakistan, Bangladesh, and Nepal. The surname originated from Ansar tribe, the Medinan people who helped the Islamic prophet, Muhammad, in his migration from Mecca to Medina. They were the first tribe in Arabia to accept Islam. The literal meaning of Ansar is "supporter".
In North India, the community are known as Ansari  while in Maharashtra the community are known as Momin or saudagar

The community are found throughout India, but Varanasi District, in Uttar Pradesh, is always regarded by most Momin as the centre of their community. In that city, the Ansari are said to make up a third of the city's population. Important Ansari neighbourhoods in the city include Madanpura, Adampura and Jaitpura. There are many people outside South Asia with the surname Ansari; however, this article is strictly about a Muslim South Asian community.

History 
The Ansaris of North India are mainly a landlord community, but some are small- and medium-scale farmers. They have always been connected with the textile work. Many members of the community have entered private or government service.

The Ansaris do not have any traditional social councils, but have an India-wide community organization, the All India Momin Conference. They are an endogamous community, only rarely marrying out of their group. There is no system of clans, and cross and parallel cousin marriages are common.

The Ansaris are  Muslims of the Sunni sect. Historically, the community produced the sage, scholars and philosopher. The Ansari are an Urdu-speaking community, although the Ansari clan of Gujarat have Gujarati as their mother tongue.

In Bihar 
The Ansari community is found throughout Bihar and Jharkhand. In Bihar, they are found in all the districts. They are active in politics. Their socio-economic condition has constantly improved. They play active roles in all walks of life in Bihar. In Jharkhand, they are mainly found in Koderma, Hazaribagh, Gumla, Ranchi, Lohardaga and Singhbhum districts. They speak the Sadri dialect, which is distinctive to the community, although most have knowledge of Urdu. The community is endogamous, and marry within a close kin group. Like other Ansaris, they were historically into the textile work, although most of them are medium- and small-scale farmers. The Momin Conference was founded in Bihar, and the Bihar Ansaris have played a key role in the organization.

In Gujarat 
In Gujarat, there are two distinct communities commonly known as Momin, the native Gujarati-speaking Garana Ansari, and the immigrant Ansari community, originally from North India. The Garana Ansari community in Gujarat are found mainly in the districts of Junagarh, Ahmedabad, Surat and Kutch. They speak Gujarati with substantial Urdu loanwords.

In addition to membership in the Momin Conference, the Gujarat Ansaris also have their own clan association, Garana TitaFari Jamaat.

The traditional occupation of the Ansari is still textile work. Many of them are engaged in zari work, which involves sari embroidery. This is especially the case in the towns of Jamnagar and Dhoraji, which each have traditional quarters inhabited by the Ansaris.

The Shaikh Ansari are an Urdu-speaking community, and are said to have immigrated from Delhi, Rajasthan and Uttar Pradesh some three hundred years ago. In Baroda, they were invited by the ruling dynasty to help in the construction of public buildings from Rajasthan. The Shaikh Ansari are divided into four endogamous groups, the Bijnor Ansari, originating from the city of Bijnor in Uttar Pradesh; the Ganga Parvala, originating from the village of Gomtipur and its surroundings in Uttar Pradesh; the Delhiwala, originally from Delhi; and the Pratapgarh Ansari originating from the city of Pratapgarh and surrounding areas in eastern Uttar Pradesh. They are mainly distributed in the cities of Ahmedabad, Surat, Bharuch, Baroda, and Rajpipla.

Textile working was the traditional occupation of the Ansari, and at present those in Ahmadabad still engage in this activity. Many Ahmadabad Ansari are now power loom owners. But many Shaikh Ansari have also diversified, and now own hotels and bakeries. They are among the more successful Muslim communities in the state, having made the transition from their traditional occupation to becoming successful businessmen. The level of literacy is steadily increasing, and many Ansari are now graduates.

The Ansari have no traditional clan association, but are members of the All India Momin Conference. Historically, each of the four sub-divisions would have had their own informal clan association, headed by a chaudhary. These have all but disappeared.

In Rajasthan 
The Ansari of Rajasthan claim that they were once warriors, who, after a defeat, took to the occupation of weaving. They are also known as Deswali Shaikh, and speak the Madri dialect, which is a mixture of Urdu and Hindi. They are one of the larger Muslim communities in Rajasthan, and  re found in the districts of Tonk, Jaipur and Sawai Madhopur. The Ansari are strictly endogamous and practice both parallel and cross cousin marriages. Their main occupation is weaving, and they use both hand-held and power looms. Quite a few are now involved in tailoring and the manufacture of bidis, a local cigarette. The Rajasthan Ansari are members of the Moin Conference, as well as having local informal clan councils, which deal with inter community disputes, while the Momin Conference acts as a pressure group dealing with the state government. The Ansari are Sunni, and have provided many of the Ulema in Rajasthan.

Momin of Maharashtra 
The Momin of Maharashtra are also known as Ansari or saudagar 
They are descended from immigrants from North India. They are split into two groupings, the giyara gaonwala and the bais goanwala. The former are found in Ahmadnagar, while the latter are found near Pune. The Momin were historically a community of weavers, found mainly in the towns and cities of western Maharashtra. They are found mainly in the districts of Pune, Nasik, Ahmednagar, Aurangabad, Jalna, Osmanabad, Dhule, Nagpur, Thane(Bhiwandi), Kolhapur, Raigarh, parbhani and Nanded. The community speak Urdu, but the Momin are bilingual, speaking Marathi as well. They are strictly endogamous, and tend to marry close kin. The Momin are Sunni, and are a fairly orthodox community.

Their traditional occupation was textile work, and many Momin have set up handlooms. Those Momin who have set up powerlooms tend to be more successful. Many Momin are employed by other Momin in these powerlooms; this is especially the case in the towns of Bhiwandi, Malegaon and Nagpur. A significant number are also employed in the textile industries.

The Momin are largely an urban community, with only small number found as agriculturists. Many Momin are now successful entrepreneurs and professionals such as teachers, engineers and doctors. Like other Ansari communities, the Momin are members of the All-India Momin Conference, one of the oldest Muslim organizations in India. This organization acts as a welfare organization, as well as lobbying on behalf of the community.

Pakistan 

After the independence of Pakistan in 1947, many members of the Momin Ansari community migrated to Pakistan and settled mainly in the Sindh province. The Momin Ansari is mainly settled in Karachi and Hyderabad cities of the Sindh province. The Momin Ansari lost their distinct group identity as they assimilated and are now an integral part of the Urdu-speaking Muhajir community of Pakistan.
In Wazirabad Toor is also a sub cast of Ansari.

Notable people

Governors
 Abd al-Samad Khan, Governor of Punjab from 1713 to 1719
 Zakariya Khan Bahadur, Governor of Punjab from 1726 to 1745
Wazir Khan (Lahore), (Shaikh alım ud-din Ansari), known as Nawab Wazir Khan was the governed of Lahore at the time of Mughal emperor Shah jahan.

Actor
Humayun Saeed, Famous Pakistani Actor.
Ali Ansari (actor), Pakistani Actor.

Others                          
Abbas Ansari (born 1992), Indian sportsman and shooter 
Abdulaziz Rashid Al Ansari (born 1992), Qatari footballer
Abdul Haq Ansari (1931–2012), Indian Islamic philosopher
Abdul Qaiyum Ansari (1905–1973), Indian active in the freedom struggle of India
Abdur Razzaque Ansari, Indian Muslim nationalist, freedom fighter, and a weavers revolution leader
Afzal Ansari (born 1953), Indian politician
Akbar Ansari (born 1988), English cricketer of Pakistani descent 
Akram Ansari (born 1954), Pakistani politician
Ali Al Ansari, Emirati paralympic athlete 
Allama Mustafa Hussain Ansari, (1945–2006), Kashmiri writer and public speaker
Asad Ansari, Pakistani-Canadian accused of terrorism
Aziz Ansari (born 1983), American actor, comedian, writer, producer, and director
Bushra Ansari, Pakistani television presenter, comedian, singer, actress and playwright
Faheem Ansari, an Indian national who was charged with involvement in the 2008 Mumbai attacks
Faris Muslim al Ansari (born 1984), Afghan held in Guantanamo
Furkan Ansari (born 1948), Indian politician
Hashim Amala, South African Cricketer
Jamshed Ansari (1942–2005), Pakistani film, television and radio actor
Khalid A. H. Ansari, Indian entrepreneur, journalist
Khizar Humayun Ansari, British race relations academic
Khwaja Ahmad Abbas, (1914–1987), popularly known as K. A. Abbas, Indian film director
Master Taj-ud-Din Ansari, Pakistani politician
Mateen Ansari (c. 1915–1943), Indian soldier awarded George Cross for conspicuous gallantry in British army
Maulana Mohammad Abbas Ansari (born 1936), revolutionary Shiite Muslim leader in Jammu & Kashmir and Founder of Ittihadul Muslimeen
Mohammad Ansari (disambiguation), a number of people named Mohammad Ansari
Mohammad Ansari (cricketer), Pakistani cricketer
Mohammad Ebrahim Ansari (1936–2011), Iraqi Twelver Shi'a Marja
Mohammad H. Ansari Theoretical Physicist
Mohammad Hamid Ansari (born 1937), Indian politician
Muhammad Fazlur Rahman Ansari (1914–1974), Indian Islamic scholar and philosopher
Mohammed Jaber Al-Ansari (born 1939), Bahraini philosopher
Mohammed Yusuf Ansari (born 1970), Indian Footballer
Mukhtar Ansari, Indian mafia-don turned politician
Mukhtar Ahmed Ansari (1880–1936), Indian nationalist and political leader
Mustafa al-Ansari, Saudi accused of terrorism
Rais Ansari, Urdu Indian poet
Sahar Ansari, Pakistani Urdu poet, critic and scholar of Urdu literature and linguistics
Salim Miya Ansari, Nepalese politician
Saman Ansari (born 1974), Pakistani television actress
Sarah Ansari, professor of history
Sheikh Sadiq Ali Ansari (active 1901), Indian politician
Sibakatullah Ansari, Indian politician
SM Razaullah Ansari (born 1932), Indian physicist
Zabiuddin Ansari a.k.a. Abu Hamza or Abu Jundal, an Indian national, fundamentalist/terrorist belonging to Indian Mujahideen and Lashkar-e-Taiba. He is accused of being involved in 2008 Mumbai attacks.
Zeeshan Ansari (born 1999), Indian cricketer
Zafar Ansari (born 1991), English cricketer of Pakistani descent
Zafar Ishaq Ansari (1932–2016), Pakistani scholar of Islamic Studies
Ziaur Rahman Ansari (1925–1992) Indian politician

References 

Social groups of Pakistan
Muslim communities of Bihar
Muslim communities of Maharashtra
Muslim communities of Gujarat
Muhajir communities
Weaving communities of South Asia
Muslim communities of Uttar Pradesh
Muslim communities of Nepal
Muhajir people